Golden Globe Award for Best English-Language Foreign Film was a Golden Globe award that was split from Best Foreign Film in 1957. It was discontinued in 1973.

Winners
 1948 – Hamlet
 1955 – Richard III
 1957 – Woman in a Dressing Gown
 1958 – A Night to Remember
 1960 – The Trials of Oscar Wilde
 1963 – No Award
 1964 – Girl with Green Eyes
 1965 – Darling
 1966 – Alfie
 1967 – The Fox
 1968 – Romeo and Juliet
 1969 – Oh! What a Lovely War

1970s

External links

Foreign Film English-Language
Awards established in 1957